Eke is the name of the following people:

Given name
 Eke Uzoma (born 1989), Nigerian footballer

Surname
 ʻAisake Eke, Tongan
 Alexander Eke (1912–2004), British basketball player
 Algı Eke (born 1985), Turkish actress
 Chacha Eke, Nigerian actress 
 Frank Eke (1931–2013), Nigerian medical doctor and politician
 Harrison Eke (1888–1917), English footballer
 John Eke (1886–1964), Swedish athlete 
 Michael Eke (born 1968), English former policeman
 Nadia Eke (born 1993), Ghanaian triple jumper
 Prince Eke, Nigerian actor
 Urum Kalu Eke (born 1964), Nigerian banker